Vladana ( is female given name. It is Slavic name. It is a feminine form of the name Vladan. Pronounced "vlah-dah-nah".

Name Days
Czech: 30 August
Slovak: 16 October

Famous bearers
Vladana Vučinić, a Montenegrin singer
Vladana Likar-Smiljanić, an illustrator of children’s books

References

Miloslava Knappová, Jak se bude vaše dítě jmenovat?

Czech feminine given names
Slovak feminine given names
Serbian feminine given names